Thiotricha rabida is a moth of the family Gelechiidae. It was described by Edward Meyrick in 1929. It is found in Assam, India.

References

Moths described in 1929
Thiotricha
Taxa named by Edward Meyrick